Full Dive, short for , is a Japanese light novel series written by Light Tuchihi and illustrated by Youta. Media Factory has published four volumes since August 2020 under their MF Bunko J imprint. A manga adaptation with art by Kino was serialized in Media Factory's seinen manga magazine Monthly Comic Alive from January 2021 to January 2022. An anime television series adaptation by ENGI aired from April to June 2021.

Plot
Hiroshi Yūki, with the player name of Hiro, is a high school boy who loves to play virtual reality MMORPGs in order to escape reality. When a game store manager named Reona Kisaragi tricks him into buying the game Kiwame Quest, he soon discovers that it is not what it seems. Unlike regular games, it is a game that tries to pursue realism to a fanatical point. As such, Hiroshi struggles to eke out a niche. Despite the disadvantages, he is determined to complete the game.

Characters

Main characters

Hiroshi is a high school student who is tricked into buying Kiwame Quest by game store manager, Reona Kisaragi. He is a former member of the track team who quit following an unfortunate incident and he likes to play VRMMORPGs in order to escape reality. His player name is Hiro.

Reona is a game store manager who tricks Hiroshi into buying Kiwame Quest. She likes to tease him and her in-game avatar is that of a fairy. 

Alicia is one of Hiroshi's childhood friends in Kiwame Quest. She has an older brother named Martin in-game.

Mizarisa is the town inquisitor in Kiwame Quest.

Kaede is Hiroshi's younger sister. She used to look up to her older brother, but their relationship has been strained ever since he quit the track team.

NPCs

Martin is one of Hiroshi's childhood friends in Kiwame Quest. He is also Alicia's older brother in-game.

Tesla is the captain of the City Guard in Kiwame Quest.

Govern is the queen of Ted in Kiwame Quest.

Other characters

Ginji is a veteran player of Kiwame Quest.

Kamui is the only known player who has successfully completed Kiwame Quest.

Media

Light novels
Light Tuchihi launched the light novel series, with illustrations by Youta, under Media Factory's MF Bunko J label on August 25, 2020.

Manga
A manga adaptation by Kino was serialized in Media Factory's Monthly Comic Alive magazine from January 27, 2021, to January 27, 2022. Two tankōbon volumes were released from May 21, 2021, to January 21, 2022.

Anime
An anime television series adaptation was announced on December 4, 2020. The series was animated by ENGI and directed by Kazuya Miura, with Kenta Ihara writing the series' scripts, and Yūta Kevin Kenmotsu designing the characters. It ran from April 7 to June 23, 2021 on AT-X, Tokyo MX, SUN, KBS Kyoto, and BS11. Mayu Maeshima performed the opening theme "Answer", while Ayana Taketatsu, Fairouz Ai, Shiori Izawa, and Aoi Koga performed the ending theme "Kisuida!". It ran for 12 episodes. 

Funimation licensed the series. On June 8, 2021, Funimation announced that the series would receive an English dub, which premiered the following day. Following Sony's acquisition of Crunchyroll, the series was moved to Crunchyroll.

Episode list

See also
 Cautious Hero: The Hero Is Overpowered but Overly Cautious, another light novel series by the same author

Notes

References

External links
 
 

2020 Japanese novels
Anime and manga based on light novels
Artificial intelligence in fiction
AT-X (TV network) original programming
Crunchyroll anime
ENGI
Fiction about death games
Fictional video games
Kadokawa Dwango franchises
Light novels
Massively multiplayer online role-playing games in fiction
Media Factory manga
MF Bunko J
Seinen manga
Television shows about video games
Television shows about virtual reality